The Aumic House in Guilderland, New York was built in 1887.  It is a massive, composite styled building with hipped roof and gables and dormers.  It includes Shingle Style and Colonial Revival elements.  The house is built partway up a hill, the Helderberg Escarpment, and has a "commanding view of Altamont and the area east".

It was listed on the National Register of Historic Places in 1982. The listing included two contributing buildings on a  area.

References

Houses on the National Register of Historic Places in New York (state)
Shingle Style houses
Colonial Revival architecture in New York (state)
Houses completed in 1887
Houses in Albany County, New York
National Register of Historic Places in Albany County, New York
Shingle Style architecture in New York (state)